Lillingston is a surname otherwise spelled Lillingstone or Lillingstein from Lilienstein in Saxon Switzerland.

Notable people with the surname
Eduardo Lillingston (born 1977), Mexican footballer
Luke Lillingston (1653–1713), British Army general
Sandie Lillingston (born 1968), Australian actress

See also
Lillington (disambiguation)
Lillingstone (disambiguation)